Dreadlocks, also known as locs or dreads, are rope-like strands of hair formed by locking or braiding hair.

Origins 

Some of the earliest depictions of dreadlocks date back as far as 1600–1500 BCE in the Minoan Civilization, one of Europe's earliest civilizations, centred in Crete (now part of Greece). Frescoes discovered on the Aegean island of Thera (modern Santorini, Greece) depict individuals with long braided hair or long dreadlocks.

In ancient Egypt, examples of Egyptians wearing locked hairstyles and wigs have appeared on bas-reliefs, statuary and other artifacts. Mummified remains of Egyptians with locked wigs have also been recovered from archaeological sites.

During the Bronze and Iron Ages, many peoples in the Near East, Anatolia, Caucasus, East Mediterranean and North Africa such as the Sumerians, Elamites and Ancient Egyptians were depicted in art with braided or plaited hair and beards. However, braids are not dreadlocks, and it is not always possible to tell from these images which are being depicted.

Etymology
The history of the name "dreadlocks" is unclear. Some authors trace the term to the Rastafarians, coining it as a reference to their wearing the hairstyle as a sign of their "dread" (or fear) of God. Other authors have speculated that the "dread" component could refer to the reaction of British soldiers upon encountering Mau Mau fighters who had this hairstyle.

History 

In Ancient Greece, kouros sculptures from the archaic period depict men wearing dreadlocks.

The style was worn by Ancient Christian Ascetics in the Middle East and Mediterranean, and the Dervishes of Islam, among others. Some of the very earliest adherents of Christianity in the Middle East may have worn this hairstyle; there are descriptions of James the Just, first Bishop of Jerusalem, who is said to have worn them to his ankles.

Pre-Columbian Aztec priests were described in Aztec codices (including the Durán Codex, the Codex Tudela and the Codex Mendoza) as wearing their hair untouched, allowing it to grow long and curl around itself. Bernal Diaz del Castillo records:here were priests with long robes of black cloth ... The hair of these priests was very long and so knotted that it could not be separated or disentangled, and most of them had their ears scarified, and their hair was clotted with blood.
 In Senegal, the Baye Fall, followers of the Mouride movement, a Sufi movement of Islam founded in 1887 AD by Shaykh Aamadu Bàmba Mbàkke, are famous for growing dreadlocks and wearing multi-colored gowns. Cheikh Ibra Fall, founder of the Baye Fall school of the Mouride Brotherhood, popularized the style by adding a mystic touch to it. Warriors among the Fulani, Wolof and Serer in Mauritania, and Mandinka in Mali were known for centuries to have worn cornrows when young and dreadlocks when old.

Larry Wolff in his book Inventing Eastern Europe: The Map of Civilization on the Mind of Enlightenment mentions that in Poland, for about a thousand years, some people wore a knotted hairstyle similar to that of some Scythians. Zygmunt Gloger in his Encyklopedia staropolska mentions that the Polish plait (plica polonica) hairstyle was worn by some people in the Pinsk region and the Masovia region at the beginning of the 19th century. The Polish plait can vary between one large plait and multiple plaits that resemble dreadlocks. 

By culture 

Locks have been worn for various reasons in each culture. Their use has also been raised in debates about cultural appropriation. Evidently, dreadlocks are seen in multiple cultures across the world.

Africa 
Maasai warriors are known for their long, thin, red dreadlocks, dyed with red root extracts or red ochre.

In Nigeria, dreadlocks are viewed in a negative light due to their stereotypical association with gangs and criminal activity; men with dreadlocks face profiling from Nigerian police.

Australia 
Some Indigenous Australians of North West and North Central Australia, as well as the Gold Coast region of North East Australia, have historically worn their hair in a locked style, sometimes also having long beards that are fully or partially locked. Traditionally, some wear the dreadlocks loose, while others wrap the dreadlocks around their heads, or bind them at the back of the head. In North Central Australia, the tradition is for the dreadlocks to be greased with fat and coated with red ochre, which assists in their formation.

Buddhism 
Within Tibetan Buddhism and other more esoteric forms of Buddhism, locks have occasionally been substituted for the more traditional shaved head. The most recognizable of these groups are known as the Ngagpas of Tibet. For Buddhists of these particular sects and degrees of initiation, their locked hair is not only a symbol of their vows but an embodiment of the particular powers they are sworn to carry.  1.4.15 of the Hevajra Tantra states that the practitioner of particular ceremonies "should arrange his piled up hair" as part of the ceremonial protocol.

Hinduism 
The practice of Jaṭā (dreadlocks) is practiced in modern day Hinduism, most notably by Sadhus who follow Śiva. The Kapalikas, first commonly referenced in the 6th century CE, were known to wear Jaṭā as a form of deity imitation of the deva Bhairava-Śiva. Shiva is often depicted with dreadlocks.

Rastafari 
Rastafari movement dreadlocks are symbolic of the Lion of Judah which is sometimes centered on the Ethiopian flag. Rastafari hold that Haile Selassie is a direct descendant of King Solomon and the Queen of Sheba, through their son Menelik I. Their dreadlocks were inspired by the Nazarites of the Bible. Haile Selassie was crowned Emperor of Ethiopia in 1930. Many Jamaican Rastafarians claimed that Selassie's coronation was evidence that he was the black messiah that they believed was prophesied in the Book of Revelation. Some street preachers such as Leonard Howell, Archibald Dunkley, Robert Hinds, and Joseph Hibbert began to claim that "Haile Selassie was the returned Jesus". During the Great Depression in the 1930s, the Rastafari message spread from  Kingston to the rest of Jamaica, especially among poor communities.

The cultivation of dreadlocks in the later Rastafari movement established a closer connection between like-minded people.

When reggae music, which espoused Rastafarian ideals, gained popularity and mainstream acceptance in the 1970s, thanks to Bob Marley's music and cultural influence, dreadlocks (often called "dreads") became a notable fashion statement worldwide, and have been worn by prominent authors, actors, athletes and rappers.

In sports 
Dreadlocks have become a popular hairstyle among professional athletes.

In professional American football, the number of players with dreadlocks has increased ever since Al Harris and Ricky Williams first wore the style during the 1990s. In 2012, about 180 National Football League players wore dreadlocks. A significant number of these players are defensive backs, who are less likely to be tackled than offensive players. As per the NFL's rulebook, a player's hair is considered part of their "uniform," meaning the locks are fair game when attempting to bring them down. 

In the NBA there has been controversy over the Brooklyn Nets guard Jeremy Lin, an Asian-American who garnered mild controversy over his choice of dreadlocks. Former NBA player Kenyon Martin accused Lin of appropriating African-American culture in a since-deleted social media post, after which Lin pointed out that Martin has multiple Chinese characters tattooed on his body.

In the US 
On 3 July 2019, California became the first US state to prohibit discrimination over natural hair. Governor Gavin Newsom signed the CROWN Act into law, banning employers and schools from discriminating against hairstyles such as dreadlocks, braids, afros, and twists. Likewise, later in 2019, Assembly Bill 07797 became law in New York state; it "prohibits race discrimination based on natural hair or hairstyles".

Guinness Book of World Records 
On 10 December 2010, the Guinness Book of World Records rested its "longest dreadlocks" category after investigation of its first and only female title holder, Asha Mandela, with this official statement:
Following a review of our guidelines for the longest dreadlock, we have taken expert advice and made the decision to rest this category. The reason for this is that it is difficult, and in many cases impossible, to measure the authenticity of the locks due to expert methods employed in the attachment of hair extensions/re-attachment of broken off dreadlocks. Effectively the dreadlock can become an extension and therefore impossible to adjudicate accurately. It is for this reason Guinness World Records has decided to rest the category and will no longer be monitoring the category for longest dreadlock.

See also 
 List of hairstyles
 Box braids
 Elflock
 Cornrows
 French braid
 Polish plait

Notes

References

External links 

 
 Dreadlocks Story – Documentary by Linda Aïnouche
 Guardian article
 

1970s fashion
1980s fashion
1990s fashion
2000s fashion
2010s fashion
Gothic fashion
Hairstyles